Robert Van Horne (born April 23, 1948) is an American composer and concert pianist. One of the most influential jazz pianist teachers during his musical training was George Shearing.

He studied Classical music at the Philadelphia Academy of Music graduating with double degrees in Piano performance and Music education. Afterwards, he continued his musical education with popular and jazz styles of composing and improvisation. 
     
He has recorded 5 piano albums, entitled, "Piano & Memories," "Rhapsody," "Moonlight Piano," "Embraced by a Dream," and "China Love" as well as 2 piano music books under WPI Records label.

In addition, he has composed a concerto for piano and orchestra, called "The Great Wall Concerto," after visiting China's wonder of the world.

Robert has performed both in Asia and the U.S.

Since 1993, Robert has been a Writer & Publisher Member of ASCAP (American Society of Composers, Authors, and Publishers). He is also member of MTAC (Music Teachers Association of California). In 2001, he joined Toastmasters International.

He was awarded the MTAC Composer Today awards in 1998 and 2010.

References

External links 
 Robert Van Horne's website
 Robert Van Horne's demonstration for his love for music

1948 births
Living people
American people of Dutch descent
American male composers
20th-century American composers
20th-century American pianists
American male pianists
21st-century American pianists
20th-century American male musicians
21st-century American male musicians